Miss USA 1985 was the 34th Miss USA pageant, televised live from the Lakeland Civic Auditorium in Lakeland, Florida on May 13, 1985, in honor of the city's centennial anniversary with a special cameo appearance by Mayor Thomas R. Shaw.  At the conclusion of the final competition, Laura Harring of Texas was crowned Miss USA 1985 by outgoing titleholder Mai Shanley of New Mexico.

Harring was the first Latina to win the crown. She later became an actress, appearing in a number of films including Mulholland Drive and as John Travolta's character's wife in The Punisher.

Results

Placements

Final Competition

Historical significance 
 Texas wins competition for the second time. 
 New Mexico earns the 1st runner-up position for the first time and reached its highest placement since Mai Shanley won in the previous year.
 Illinois earns the 2nd runner-up position for the first time.
 Louisiana earns the 3rd runner-up position for the third time. The last time it placed this was in 1983.
 Minnesota earns the 4th runner-up position for the first time.
 States that placed in semifinals the previous year were Illinois, Missouri, New Mexico, Oklahoma and Texas.
 Texas placed for the eleventh consecutive year.
 Oklahoma placed for the third consecutive year. 
 Illinois, Missouri and New Mexico made their second consecutive placement.
 Louisiana last placed in 1983.
 Hawaii and Massachusetts last placed in 1982.
 Arizona last placed in 1981.
 Minnesota last placed in 1980.

Delegates
The Miss USA 1985 delegates were:

Judges
Breck Jamieson
Patricia Maxwell
Rory Calhoun
Robert Hirschfeld
Jean Ruth Scott
Syd Mead
Jimmy Messina
Terri Utley, Miss USA 1982 from Arkansas
Martha Smith
Eric Dickerson
Richard Anderson

See also
Miss Universe 1985
Miss Teen USA 1985

References

External links
Official website

1985
May 1985 events in the United States
1985 beauty pageants
1985